The Flöz Dreibänke Formation is a geologic formation in Germany. It preserves fossils dating back to the Carboniferous period.

See also

 List of fossiliferous stratigraphic units in Germany

References
 

Carboniferous System of Europe
Carboniferous Germany